Anna Geiger may refer to:
 Anna Bella Geiger (born 1933), Brazilian artist
 Anna Margarethe Geiger (1783–1809), German pastellist